Saturnino 'Nino' Arrúa Molinas (born 7 April 1949) is a Paraguayan retired footballer who played as an attacking midfielder, and a current coach.

Considered one of the greatest footballers to ever come out of his nation, his 22-year professional career was closely associated with Cerro Porteño and Real Zaragoza.

Club career
Born in Itá near Asunción, Arrúa made his senior debuts at only 14, with local Sportivo Iteño. He was signed shortly after by Cerro Porteño, going on to win four national championships four times during his spell as well as being crowned the league's top scorer on three occasions.

In 1973 Arrúa moved to Spain and joined Real Zaragoza, remaining six seasons with the club, five of them in La Liga. He scored 17 goals in only 26 games in his first campaign for a final third-place and, during parts of his stint in Aragon, formed an efficient attacking partnership with countrymen Carlos Diarte and Felipe Ocampos which was dubbed Zaraguayos.

From 1979 until his retirement six years later Arrúa played mainly with former side Cerro Porteño – this was interspersed with a spell in Colombia with América de Cali. Subsequently, he worked as a manager, with Club 12 de Octubre, Club Atlético 3 de Febrero and Cerro.

International career
Arrúa gained 27 caps for Paraguay between 1969 and 1980, scoring 13 goals.

References

External links

1949 births
Living people
Paraguayan footballers
Paraguay international footballers
Association football midfielders
Paraguayan Primera División players
Cerro Porteño players
La Liga players
Segunda División players
Real Zaragoza players
Categoría Primera A players
América de Cali footballers
Paraguayan expatriate footballers
Expatriate footballers in Spain
Expatriate footballers in Colombia
Paraguayan football managers
12 de Octubre Football Club managers